A data cable is any media that allows baseband transmissions (binary 1s and 0s) from a transmitter to a receiver.

Examples Are:
Networking Media
Ethernet Cables (Cat5, Cat5e, Cat6, Cat6a)
Token Ring Cables (Cat4)
Coaxial cable is sometimes used as a baseband digital data cable, such as in serial digital interface and thicknet and thinnet.
Optical fiber cable; see fiber-optic communication
 Serial cable
Telecommunications Cable
 Cat2 or telephone cord
 submarine communications cable
Media devices
USB cable

Computer networking